Dampierland is an interim Australian bioregion in Western Australia. The region is also a distinct physiographic section of the larger Nullagine Platform province, which in turn is part of the larger West Australian Shield division.

The bioregion is located in the West Kimberley area and incorporates the country that is adjacent to Broome, including the Dampier Peninsula and coastal region behind Eighty Mile Beach. Its characteristic vegetation is pindan woodland.

References

Further reading
 Thackway, R and I D Cresswell (1995) An interim biogeographic regionalisation for Australia : a framework for setting priorities in the National Reserves System Cooperative Program Version 4.0 Canberra : Australian Nature Conservation Agency, Reserve Systems Unit, 1995. 

IBRA regions
Kimberley tropical savanna
Physiographic sections